Freedom Tower is a Metromover station in Downtown, Miami, Florida, directly west of the Freedom Tower and the Miami-Dade Arena.

The station is located at the intersection of Northeast Sixth Street and Second Avenue, opening to service May 26, 1994.

The station closed for renovation in July 2020 and remain closed through 2022.  The station will connect into the Miami World Center development.Freedom Tower Metromover station closes for renovations

Station layout

Places of interest
Freedom Tower
FTX Arena
Miami Worldcenter
Miami Dade College (Wolfson Campus)
Paramount Park Tower
Freedom Square

External links
 
 MDT – Metromover Stations
 6th Street entrance from Google Maps Street View
 7th Street entrance from Google Maps Street View

Metromover stations
Railway stations in the United States opened in 1994
1994 establishments in Florida
Omni Loop